Banana Island is an artificial island off the foreshore of Ikoyi, Lagos, Nigeria. Its name derives from the curvature of its shape. The island is a planned, mixed development with residential, commercial and recreational buildings.

History

The original Banana Island construction project entitled Lagoon City was the brainchild of the late Chief Adebayo Adeleke, a University of London trained Civil Engineer (MICE), and CEO of City Property Development Ltd.

Adeleke had originally commissioned a new urban development in Maroko, Victoria Island, but that project had been acquired by the Lagos State government. Following a lengthy 10 year court case, Lagos State government offered other parcels of land as consideration for the Maroko development.

Many scoffed at Chief Adeleke's decision to select the Ikoyi Island perimeter, however they were unable to appreciate the foresight of the Chief, who promptly engaged the Westminster Dredging Company to dredge the foreshore, and create six interlinked and symmetrical islands.

He wanted to create a development that would "Make Nigeria Proud", and engaged Minoru Yamasaki the architect of Manhattan's World Trade Centre 'Twin Towers' building. Starchitect Yamasaki's replica twin towers comprised the flagship iconic building on the main island.

To complete the Lagoon City concept, Chief Adeleke planned an aesthetic design including a City Airport, which was a vision conceived long before the London Docklands Development, London City Airport, Dubai's Palm Islands or Hong Kong's Chek Lap Kok Airport.

As soon as he had reclaimed the land and the idea was unveiled, others attempted to wrestle the land from him, and the project was 'acquired' again with no consideration being paid to City Property Development Limited. Since 1983, the 'acquisition' is currently being challenged in various courts, and there are Caveat Emptor warnings in place to warn prospective buyers that their investment could be at risk in future. There is also litigation pending in the UK and European courts regarding this matter.

The subsequent developers were principally interested in maximising the yield of the land at the expense of the aesthetic innovative design foreseen by Chief Adebayo Adeleke. Consequently the land was filled in to create a banana shaped island, hence Banana Island.
Banana Island, is an area of Ikoyi, Lagos, Nigeria, 8.6 kilometres east of Tafawa Balewa Square. Part of the Lagos Local Government Area of Eti-Osa in Central Lagos.

Design

Banana Island is a man-made island in Lagos State, Nigeria that is slightly curved in shape – like a banana.  It is located in the Lagos Lagoon and is connected to Ikoyi Island by a dedicated road which is linked to the existing road network near Parkview Estate.  The island was constructed by the Lebanese-Nigerian Chagoury Group in partnership with the Federal Ministry of Power, Works and Housing, and is considered to be on-par with the 7th arrondissement of Paris, La Jolla, California (in San Diego), and Tokyo's Shibuya and Roppongi neighbourhoods.

It occupies a sand-filled area of approximately 1,630,000 square metres and is divided into 536 plots (of between 1000 and 4000 square metres in size), mainly arranged along cul-de-sacs, designed as to enhance the historically residential nature of Ikoyi. Residents are provided with utilities, including underground electrical systems (versus the overhead cabling common throughout Lagos), an underground water supply network, a central sewage system/treatment plant, street lighting and satellite telecommunications networks.

The Island is a planned, mixed development, with dedicated areas for residential, commercial and recreational activities.  On the residential side of the Island, planning permission is not granted for dwellings over 3 storeys high. The developers also intend to develop a main piazza, a club-house, a primary and secondary school, a fire and police station and a medical clinic. They are also negotiating to build a 5-star hotel on the island, along with an array of smaller Guest Houses.

Composition
Banana Island hosts several high end residential developments such as Ocean Parade Towers  - a series of 14 luxury tower blocks strategically situated at one end of the island to take advantage of 180 degree panoramic views overlooking the lagoon. Similar to many of the developments on the island, it has dedicated leisure facilities such as a private health club - with tennis courts, squash courts and a swimming pool surrounded by extensive gardens.  At launch flats in Ocean Parade sold for over US$400,000.

Several leading Nigerian and International corporates such as - Etisalat Nigeria, Airtel Nigeria, Ford Foundation Nigeria and Olaniwun Ajayi & Co - are also based on Banana Island.

Notable residents

Mike Adenuga - billionaire businessman
Aliko Dangote - billionaire businessman
Davido - Afrobeats artist
Linda Ikeji - model and blogger
Iyabo Obasanjo - former Nigerian senator

References

Islands of Nigeria
Artificial islands of Lagos
Islands of Yorubaland
Mixed-use developments in Lagos